The Thayer Tutt Trophy was an international ice hockey tournament contested in 1980, 1984, and 1988 for national teams that did not qualify for the Olympic Games.

The tournament was named after William Thayer Tutt, who was the president of the International Ice Hockey Federation from 1966-1969.

Results

References

 
Ice hockey tournaments in Europe
International Ice Hockey Federation tournaments
Recurring sporting events established in 1980
Recurring sporting events disestablished in 1988